In architecture, a sexpartite vault is a rib vault divided into six bays by two diagonal ribs and three transverse ribs. 

The principal examples are those in the Abbaye-aux-Hommes and Abbaye-aux-Dames at Caen (which were probably the earliest examples of a construction now looked upon as transitional), Notre-Dame de Paris, and the cathedrals of Bourges, Laon, Senlis and Sens; from the latter cathedral the sexpartite vault was brought by William of Sens to Canterbury, and it is afterwards found at Lincoln and in St Faith's Chapel, Westminster Abbey.

See also
 List of architectural vaults
 Cathedral architecture

References

Arches and vaults